Stanford Bank Venezuela was Stanford International Bank's subsidiary in Venezuela. It was headquartered in Caracas and had several branches throughout Venezuela. The Venezuelan banking regulator estimated that Venezuelans had placed around $2.5bn in deposits with Stanford International. Stanford Bank Venezuela (SBV) was a subsidiary holding company of Stanford International, operating and licensed accorded the laws and regulations within Venezuela. Currency inflation and lack of liquidity prompted a run on several Venezuelan banks including SBV, forcing the government of Venezuela to intervene.

In May 2009 the Stanford Bank Venezuela was sold to Banco Nacional de Crédito for $111 m, with the bank being merged into BNC.

References

External links

 Allen Stanford 'fraud': Venezuelans owed one-third of 'fraudulent certificates' - The Daily Telegraph February 19, 2009

Bank failures
Defunct banks of Venezuela
Banks disestablished in 2009
Stanford Financial Group
2009 disestablishments in Venezuela